The South Dakota Air and Space Museum is an aviation museum located in Box Elder, South Dakota, just outside the main gate of Ellsworth AFB. It is dedicated to the history of the United States Air Force, the base and aerospace in South Dakota.

History
The Ellsworth Heritage Foundation was founded as a result of a United States Air Force program began in 1982 to establish museums at various bases around the country. The museum was co-founded by Gerald E. Teachout in 1983. Fundraising for a new building began in 1985, but the museum was given four former F-89 hangars and a two-story building that had been planned for demolition. The hangars and building were moved to the museum's current location near the base's main gate in 1992.

The museum received a mockup of a Northrop Grumman B-2 Spirit from the American Honda Motor Company in 1989. The following year, it restored a Boeing B-29 Superfortress and received a Boeing B-47 Stratojet from Pease Air Force Base.

A Convair B-36 on display in Texas was originally planned to be added to the museum in 1992, but it was eventually transferred to another museum. In 1994, a Minuteman II missile silo trainer located on Ellsworth Air Force Base was added to the museum inventory.

The museum received a grant in 1998 to renovate its displays. In 2001, a new entrance with a Rockwell B-1 Lancer was dedicated. Following a restoration, an AGM-28 Hound Dog missile was unveiled in 2011. A two-year landscaping project was completed in 2016. In 2017 the museum dedicated a Titan I missile on display in the outdoor airpark. In 2019, the museum partnered with the Commemorative Air Force to fly a B-25 across the state to recognize the two South Dakotans who participated in the Doolittle Raid. A model of an AGM-158 missile was placed on display in 2022.

Exhibits
The museum has four interior galleries named for Frank Hunter, Duke Corning, Clyde Ice, and Joe Foss. Displays cover the history of aerospace technology, the World Wars, the Cold War, aviation pioneers, and Ellsworth Air Force Base. A number of training aids, such as F-106 and B-1B cockpits, an F-16 simulator, and a Minuteman Crew Mission Procedures Trainer are on display. Other exhibits include Stratobowl Balloon Launches in the 1930s, 44th Bombardment Group/44th Strategic Missile Wing, and the South Dakota Aviation Hall of Fame.

Collection

Aircraft on display

 Beechcraft C-45H Expeditor 52-10866
 Beechcraft U-8D Seminole 56-3708
 Bell H-13 Sioux 58-1520
 Bell UH-1F Iroquois 65-7951
 Boeing B-29 Superfortress  44-87779
 Boeing B-52 Stratofortress 56-0657
 Boeing EC-135A 61-0262
 Cessna O-2A Skymaster 67-21422
 Cessna U-3A 53-5872
 Convair C-131D Samaritan 55-0292
 Convair F-102A Delta Dagger 56-1017
 Douglas A-26K Invader 64-17640
 Douglas C-47H Skytrain 42-93127
 Douglas C-54D Skymaster 42-72592
 General Dynamics FB-111A Aardvark 68-0248
 Lockheed T-33A 57-0590
 LTV A-7D Corsair II 74-1739
 Martin EB-57B Canberra 52-1548
 McDonnell F-101B Voodoo 59-0426
 North American F-100A Super Sabre 53-1533
 North American F-86H Sabre 53-1302
 North American VB-25J Mitchell 43-4030
 Rockwell B-1B Lancer 83-0067
 Northrop T-38 Talon 58-1192
 Republic F-105B Thunderchief 57-5839
 Republic F-84F Thunderjet 52-8886
 Stinson L-5G Sentinel 45-35046
 Vultee BT-13 Valiant 41-22204

Missiles on display

 AGM-28 Hound Dog 59-2791
 LGM-25C Titan I 61-4523
 LGM-30F Minuteman II
 MIM-3 Nike Ajax

See also
 List of aerospace museums
 List of museums in South Dakota
 North American aviation halls of fame

References

Footnotes

Notes

Bibliography

External links 

 

Aerospace museums in South Dakota
Military and war museums in South Dakota
Air force museums in the United States
Museums in Meade County, South Dakota